Michael Loss (born 1954) is a mathematician and mathematical physicist who works as a professor of mathematics at the Georgia Institute of Technology.

Loss obtained his Ph.D. in 1982 from ETH Zurich, with a dissertation on the three-body problem jointly supervised by Walter Hunziker and Israel Michael Sigal.

With Elliott H. Lieb he is the author of the textbook Analysis (Graduate Studies in Mathematics 14. American Mathematical Society, 1997; 2nd ed., 2001).

In 2012, he became one of the inaugural fellows of the American Mathematical Society, and was elected as a Foreign Corresponding Member of the Chilean Academy of Sciences. He is one of the 2015 winners of the Humboldt Prize.

References

External links
Google scholar profile

1954 births
Living people
20th-century American mathematicians
21st-century American mathematicians
Mathematical physicists
Georgia Tech faculty
Fellows of the American Mathematical Society